Toronto FC began play in Major League Soccer in 2007, and the club's first regular season match was on April 7, 2007 at the Home Depot Center in Los Angeles away to Chivas USA. Toronto FC suffered a 2–0 loss. Toronto's first home match was on April 28, 2007 at BMO Field against Kansas City Wizards. The home side lost 1–0 on an 81st-minute goal by Eddie Johnson.

Danny Dichio scored the first goal ever for Toronto FC on May 12, 2007 in the 24th minute against Chicago Fire in the franchise's first ever win, a 3–1 victory. Despite finishing last in the Eastern Conference and not making the MLS Cup Playoffs, Toronto FC was a success in its inaugural season, selling out every home game at BMO Field and capturing significant media attention in Toronto and in other MLS markets.

Dichio was also the first ever Toronto FC player red-carded, being ejected in the 44th minute of the same game as his historic goal. That strike had ended the second longest opening scoreless streak for a new club in MLS after Real Salt Lake. Toronto won the game 3–1, with additional goals by Maurice Edu and Kevin Goldthwaite. Game play was delayed several minutes as many fans threw seat cushions onto the field in celebration. The cushions had been a free gift to ticket-holders to commemorate the club's official opening weekend. Now, Toronto FC fans sing Dichio's name in the 24th minute of every match. On May 26, 2007, Dichio scored the team's first-ever goal on the road, and he scored the last goal of Toronto's first season, in the 91st minute of the final game against the New England Revolution.

At the 6th minute of Toronto FC's loss to D.C. United on August 26, Toronto FC broke the Major League Soccer record of minutes without a goal at 558 minutes. The record was previously held by Real Salt Lake. On September 22, Toronto FC ended their streak, scoring at the two-minute mark of their match against the Columbus Crew on a goal by Miguel Cañizalez, setting a league record at 824 minutes. Cañizalez's goal was also the first goal by a Canadian during MLS play at BMO Field.

In their inaugural season, Toronto FC's average attendance was 20,130, the third highest in the league behind Los Angeles Galaxy (24,252) and D.C. United (20,967).

Matches

2007 Carolina Challenge Cup

2007 Major League Soccer season

Mid-season friendlies

Appearances
Competitive matches only.

Goals

Reserve appearances
MLS reserve matches only.

Note: missing statistics from the following reserve matches: 
Colorado Rapids Reserves 3–0 Toronto FC Reserves, October 7, 2007

See also

Toronto FC seasons
Tor
Toronto Fc